Bassaleg Junction was a railway station which served the village of Bassaleg, Monmouthshire.

History
The station was opened by the Monmouthshire Railway and Canal Company on 21/23 December 1850. It appeared in timetables as "Rhymney Junction" before changing to "Bassaleg Junction" in 1858. At times, the station was sometimes referred to in Bradshaw as "Rhymney Junction for Bassaleg and Machen" and at times spelt as "Bassalleg". The line was worked by the Great Western Railway from 1 August 1875 and it later took over the Monmouthshire Railway with effect from 1 August 1880. The station closed to goods traffic on 1 September 1898.

The station closed as a wartime measure between 1 January 1917 and 1 March 1919. It closed on 30 April 1962, leaving the line to remain open for goods traffic.

Present day
Trains on the Ebbw Valley Railway pass along the old line, which was upgraded to deal with the new traffic after its use as a freight line for defunct Ebbw Vale steel works for several years. The site has housed four large self-built houses since around 1989. The old lantern room, used by railway workers to lunch, has recently been renovated by the current owners of the house on whose land it sits. The building has been painted the old Great Western Railway colours (light stone and dark stone) and a historic replica railway sign reading 'Pye Corner' is visible from the road, named after the street address and road junction.

A station named  opened close to the site of Bassaleg Junction in 2014.

References

Notes

Sources

External links
Station on a navigable 1947 O.S. map

Disused railway stations in Newport, Wales
History of Monmouthshire
Former Great Western Railway stations
Railway stations in Great Britain opened in 1850
Railway stations in Great Britain closed in 1917
Railway stations in Great Britain opened in 1919
Railway stations in Great Britain closed in 1962